Nar Sher Ali Khan is a union council of Bagh District, Azad Kashmir,  Kashmir District, which is situated in the mountains. Nar  is the original name of this union council.sher Ali khan name derived from an old man and native of Nar kass (Sarkar Ali khan) and 
     There was a government servant after whom the village was named    ( Sardar Sher Ali Khan).
Shrine of Sardar Sher Ali Khan at Village . Nar Shar Ali Khan 

Populated places in Bagh District
(Magray_Sarkar)